This article lists foramina that occur in the human body.



Skull 

The human skull has numerous openings (foramina), through which cranial nerves, arteries, veins, and other structures pass. These foramina vary in size and number, with age.

Spine 

Within the vertebral column (spine) of vertebrates, including the human spine, each bone has an opening at both its top and bottom to allow nerves, arteries, veins, etc. to pass through.

Other 
 Apical foramen, the opening at the tip of the root of a tooth
 Foramen ovale (heart), an opening between the venous and arterial sides of the fetal heart
 Foramen transversarium, one of a pair of openings in each cervical vertebra, in which the vertebral artery travels
 Greater sciatic foramen, a major foramen of the pelvis
 Interventricular foramen, channels connecting ventricles in the brain
 Intervertebral foramen, foramina formed between vertebrae
 Lesser sciatic foramen, an opening between the pelvis and the posterior thigh
 Obturator foramen, the opening created by the ischium and pubis bones of the pelvis
 Vertebral foramen, the foramen formed by the anterior segment (the body), and the posterior part, the vertebral arch

References

Foramina